Ekari (also Ekagi, Kapauku, Mee) is a Trans–New Guinea language spoken by about 100,000 people in the Paniai lakes region of the Indonesian province of Papua, including the villages of Enarotali, Mapia and Moanemani. This makes it the second-most populous Papuan language in Indonesian New Guinea after Western Dani. Language use is vigorous. Documentation is quite limited.

Phonology

Consonants 

The voiced velar stop (ɡᶫ) is pronounced with lateral release. Doble (1987) describes both /k/ and /ɡᶫ/ as being labialized [kʷ, ɡᶫʷ] after the back vowels /o, u/ (i.e. okei 'they', euga 'more'), with g having 'varying' degrees of the lateral. Staroverov & Tebay (2019) describe /ɡᶫ/ as being velar lateral [ɡᶫ] before front vowels and uvular non-lateral [ɢʶ] before non-front vowels. When lateral, there is usually a stop onset, but occasionally just [ʟ] is heard.

/j/ is a 'more palatalized ' (perhaps  or ) before the high front vowel /i/ (i.e. yina 'insect').

Vowels 
Both Doble (1987) and Staroverov & Tebay (2019) describe five vowel qualities. Long vowels and diphthongs are analyzed as sequences.

Tone
Ekari has pitch accent. One syllable in a word may have a high tone, contrasting with words without a high tone. If the vowel is long or a diphthong and not at the end of the word, the high tone is phonetically rising. 

CV words have no tone contrast. CVV words may be mid/low or high. (In all of these patterns, here and following, initial C is optional.)

Words of the following shapes may have a contrastive high tone on the final syllable: CVCV, CVCVV. Words of the following shapes may have either a rising or a falling tone on the first long syllable: CVVCV, CVVCVV, CVCVVCVV, CVVCVCV (rare), CVVCVCVV (rare). The following word shapes do not have contrastive tone: CVCVCV, CVCVVCV, CVCVCVV, and words of 4 or more syllables.

References

Bibliography 
 Doble, Marion (1962). "Essays on Kapauku grammar". Nieuw Guinea Studiën. 6: 152-5, 211-8, 279-98.

External links 
Materials on Ekari are included in the open access Arthur Capell collections held by Paradisec:
 AC1
 AC2

Paniai Lakes languages
Languages of western New Guinea